The Women's madison competition at the 2021 UCI Track Cycling World Championships was held on 23 October 2021.

Results

Qualifying
The first eight teams qualify for the final.

Heat 1
The race was started at 11:04.

Heat 2
The race was started at 11:24.

Final
The final was started at 18:10. 120 laps (30 km) with 12 sprints were raced.

References

Women's madison